Talgat Amangeldiuly Ermegiyayev (Talgat Amangeldiuly Ermegııaev) was the Chairman of the now-defunct Kazakhstan Agency of Sport and Physical Culture.

On January 24, 2012 Ermegiyayev was appointed Chairman of the Agency of Sport and Physical Culture. On January 16, 2013, Ermegiyaev was appointed Chairman of the Board of the Astana EXPO-2017 National Company.

References 

1969 births
Living people